Loudin is a surname. It may originate in Scotland, where Loudin or Loudon are alternative spellings of Lothian, a place name. Notable people with the surname include:

Forest Loudin (1890–1935), American football coach
Frederick J. Loudin (1836–1904), American singer
Vojtěch Loudín (born 1990), Czech skater

Maureen Loudin
Loudon (name)
Lowden (disambiguation)

References